Ecalene is a trademarked mixture of alcohols, which may be used as fuel or as a fuel additive. The typical composition of Ecalene is as follows:

References
Power Energy Fuels, Inc.
PEFI Alcohol Process Development & Demonstration

Fuels
Alcohols
Fuel additives